Betty Acquah (born 20 March 1965) is a Ghanaian feminist painter. She uses the techniques of pointillism, oil painting and acrylic.

Early life and education 
A native of Cape Coast in Ghana, she spent part of her schooling at Wesley Girls' Senior High School and Holy Child School. Then furthered at the Kwame Nkrumah University of Science and Technology where she obtained a master's degree in Visual Arts specializing in painting. In Japan, she also completed a professional arts course at the Tokyo School of Art

Career 
Acquah has been working for seven years for the art gallery of the Center for National Culture in Accra and has been curating exhibitions at the Berj Art Gallery from 2002 to 2005. She is a member of Ghana Association of Visual Artists. In June 2019, she said in an interview with Newsday BBC that she hoped for the opening of a national art gallery in Ghana.

Acquah has exhibited in Ghana, Nigeria, the United Kingdom, India, Germany, Spain, Japan and the United States.

Her work highlights the Ghanaian women she sees as the "unsung heroes of the republic of Ghana".

References 

1965 births
People from Cape Coast
Kwame Nkrumah University of Science and Technology alumni
Alumni of Holy Child High School, Ghana
20th-century Ghanaian painters
21st-century women artists
21st-century Ghanaian painters
20th-century women artists
Ghanaian women painters
Living people